Garry Young (born 10 July 1939) is a former Australian rules footballer who played for Hawthorn in the Victorian Football League (VFL).

A key position forward, Young topped Hawthorn's goalkicking in 1959 and 1960 and was a premiership player in 1961.

Family

Garry's brother Maurie Young played 71 games for Hawthorn between 1956 and 1960.

Honours and achievements
Hawthorn
 VFL premiership player: 1961
 2× Minor premiership: 1961, 1963

Individual
 2× Hawthorn leading goalkicker: 1959, 1960
 Hawthorn life member

External links

References
http://australianfootball.com/players/player/Garry%2BYoung/8675
http://www.hawthornfc.com.au/history/premierships  - 1961 Hawthorn premiership team

1939 births
Australian rules footballers from Victoria (Australia)
Hawthorn Football Club players
Hawthorn Football Club Premiership players
Living people
One-time VFL/AFL Premiership players